Henri-Joseph Koumba Bididi (Arabic: هنري جوزيف كومبا بيديدي; born 15 July 1957), is a Gabonese filmmaker, screenwriter and television production manager primarily direct documentary films. He has made several critically acclaimed documentaries including The King's Necklace and Le Singe Fou. Apart from direction, he also produced, wrote or directed several documents for television.

Personal life
He was born on 15 July 1957 in Omboué, Gabon. He graduated in film education from École supérieure d'études cinématographiques (E.S.E.C) in France.

Career
In 1983, Bididi worked as the in–charge of the casting for the film Équateur directed by Serge Gainsbourg. Then in 1986, he signed to the short film Le singe fou. He was awarded the prize for criticism of Arab journalists at the Carthage Film Festival and also the Great Short Film award at 10th Panafrican Film and Television Festival of Ouagadougou (FESPACO) in 1987.

From 1988 to 1991, Bididi was the director of the regional radio and television broadcasting unit of 'Haut-Ogoué'. From 1991 to 1994, Bididi was promoted to the new deputy director general of Radio Télévision Gabonaise (RTG). In 2000, he continued to work as a director for television and a producer for his maiden feature film, Les Couilles de l'éléphant. The film was screened at 17th Pan African Film Festival in Ouagadougou, Burkina Faso. In 1994, Bididi directed two episodes of the TV series L’auberge du Salut.

From 2003 to 2008, he worked as Associate producer of television serial Affaires Voisins and then as the Executive producer and co-writer of the serial Les Annèes Écoles as well as directed 6 episodes. In 2011, he directed second feature film Le collier du Makoko. He was the co-writer and executive producer of the soap opera TV series Claudia et dora.

In the same year, he directed the feature film Le collier du Makoko, which is most expensive film in sub-Saharan Africa shot with a cost of 4 million euros. The film was prepared over 4 years, where the shooting took three months. The film received critical acclaim from several international film festivals and won the Special jury prize and male interpretation prize at the 2012 Khouribga festival in Morocco. It also won the Interpretation award at the 2012 Ecrans Noirs Festival in Cameroon as then Prize for best soundtrack and best poster at FESPACO 2013. In 2013, the film won Audience Award at the 2013 Masuku Film Festival in Gabon.

Filmography

References

External links
 
 "Le collier du Makoko" un film de Henri Joseph KOUMBA BIDIDI (Gabon - Fiction)

Gabonese film directors
Living people
1957 births
Documentary film directors
People from Ogooué-Maritime Province
21st-century Gabonese people